Warisi was the King of Kano from 1063 to 1095. He was the son of Bagauda and Saju.

Succession
Warisi was succeeded by his son Gijimasu.

Biography in the Kano Chronicle
Below is a biography of Warisi from Palmer's 1908 English translation of the Kano Chronicle.

References

11th-century monarchs in Africa
Monarchs of Kano
1095 deaths